Indebted is an American television sitcom that aired on NBC from February 6 to April 16, 2020. The series was created by Dan Levy and co-executive produced with Doug Robinson, Andy Ackerman and David Guarascio for Sony Pictures Television.

In June 2020, the series was canceled after one season.

Plot
The series follows a couple, Dave and Rebecca, who are ready to start a new life after years of parenting. That is, until Dave's parents show up unannounced and broke, leaving Dave with no choice but to open the door to the people who gave him everything, which eventually leads to a clash of parental chaos among families.

Cast

Main

 Adam Pally as Dave Klein, Rebecca's husband.
 Abby Elliott as Rebecca Klein, Dave's wife.
 Jessy Hodges as Joanna Klein, Dave's lesbian sister and owner of a pet-grooming shop.
 Steven Weber as Stew Klein, Dave's father, and a retired TV pitchman.
 Fran Drescher as Debbie Klein, Dave's loving but extremely overbearing mother.

Recurring
 Anders Garrett as Asher Klein, Dave and Rebecca's son.
 Vivien Lyra Blair as Hazel Klein, Dave and Rebecca's daughter (Margaux Heck portrayed the character in the pilot).

Guest
 Asif Ali as Ravi, Dave's childhood friend and employee who flips houses for a living.
Lilan Bowden as Hannah, Joanna's girlfriend.
Richard Kind as Artie, Dave's uncle and Debbie's older brother.

Episodes

Production

Development
On January 23, 2019, it was announced that NBC had given the production, then titled Uninsured, received a pilot order commitment. The pilot was written by Dan Levy who was also set to executive produce alongside Doug Robinson, Alison Greenspan and Andy Ackerman. Production companies involved with the pilot include Doug Robinson Productions and Sony Pictures Television. On May 11, 2019, it was announced that NBC had given the green-lighting production, now titled changed to Indebted, a series order. A few days later, it was announced that the series would premiere as a mid-season replacement in the mid-season of 2020. The series premiered on February 6, 2020. On June 15, 2020, NBC canceled the series after one season.

Casting
In February 2019, it was announced that Adam Pally and Abby Elliott had been cast in the pilot's leading roles. Although the pilot was ordered, in March 2019 it was reported that Fran Drescher and Steven Weber had joined the cast.

Reception

Critical response
On Rotten Tomatoes, the series holds an approval rating of 27% with an average rating of 3.85/10, based on 11 reviews. On Metacritic, it has a weighted average score of 36 out of 100, based on 8 critics, indicating "generally unfavorable reviews".

Ratings

References

External links

 Indebted on Sony Liv

2020 American television series debuts
2020 American television series endings
2020s American sitcoms
English-language television shows
NBC original programming
Poverty in television
Television series about families
Television series by Sony Pictures Television
Television series by Universal Television
Television shows set in Connecticut